Gool Nasikwala is a former table tennis player from India. In 1952, she won several medals in singles, and doubles events in the Asian Table Tennis Championships in Singapore.

See also
 List of table tennis players

References

Indian female table tennis players